Pathway to Adventure Council is a Boy Scouts of America local council headquartered in Chicago, Illinois. Created from the merger of four councils, it now spans over a large portion of Chicago metropolitan area and part of Northwest Indiana. The council operates two camps and four service centers and has over 21,000 youth members.

History 
In 2014, the Chicago Area Council, Des Plaines Valley Council, Northwest Suburban Council, and Calumet Council announced they would be merging to increase efficiency and to remain sustainable as an organization. The merger occurred on January 1, 2015. At first, each of the predecessor councils were reorganized as "Communities" with each maintaining their service centers and schedules. The council has since homogenized the communities by creating districts that span over the boundaries of the former councils. The new council inherited several long-term camps from its predecessor councils, but closed Camp Mach-Kin-O-Siew and Camp Shin-Go-Beek in 2015 and announced the closure of Camp Lakota. Camp Lakota's closing was delayed for several years, and ceased operations on May 23, 2021. In 2021, the council announced that Camp Napowan in Wild Rose, Wisconsin would be closed and put up for sale. The camp was closed on October 11, 2021.

In 2015, the Illinois General Assembly passed a resolution praising the council and declared September 15, 2015 as "Scouts of Illinois Recruitment Day" within Illinois.

Organization 
The council is formed by ten districts that cover parts of Cook, DuPage, Lake, and Will counties in Illinois, and Lake County, Indiana. Four service centers inherited from the predecessor councils support Pathway to Adventure Council, with centers located in Arlington Heights, Illinois, Chicago, Illinois, La Grange, Illinois and Munster, Indiana. For a short period, the council operated the Boy Scout Discovery Outpost at Woodfield Mall.

Camps 
The council operates two camps: Camp Frank S. Betz in Berrien Springs, Michigan and Owasippe Scout Reservation in Twin Lake, Michigan. The council previously operated more camps that it acquired in the merger, but they have since ceased operations to reduce operational expenditures.

Camp Frank S. Betz 
Camp Frank S. Betz is located in Berrien Springs, Michigan. Named after the person who donated the land for the camp, it has been continually operating since 1922.

Owasippe Scout Reservation 

Owasippe Scout Reservation is a resident camp located in Twin Lake, Michigan. Founded in 1911, it is the oldest continually operated Scout Camp in the United States.

Former camps 
Camp Mach-Kin-O-Siew and Camp Shin-Go-Beek were former summer camps operated by Des Plaines Valley Council that were closed shortly after the merger. Camp Lakota, located in Woodstock, Illinois, was permanently closed on May 23, 2021.

Camp Napowan (CLOSED) 

Camp Napowan was a 400-acre Scouts BSA camp located in Wild Rose, Wisconsin. It was founded in the year 1946, formerly a tree farm. It is located between Hills Lake and Lake Napowan, with pine forests and a large variety of other trees surrounding the rest of the camp from its days as a logging operation. During the summer months, the camp operated an eight-week camping experience for scouts who stay for one- or two-week sessions. The camp typically drew around 2,000 campers each summer.

The camp staff lived on the grounds during the summer; in total there were usually over 70 staff members during the summer season. Harrison Ford worked in the Nature program area in 1957.

A new dining pavilion was constructed in 2009, with the dedication occurring on April 16, 2009. The camp's main office is located in the heart of the camp, near the main parade field. The camp has an enclosed dining hall near the main parade field with a full kitchen attached, usually used for cooking, and a larger dining pavilion used for serving meals.

Camp Napowan's program areas included: aquatics (swimming and boating), COPE (Climbing tower and High Adventure Course), nature, Skynet (STEM), shooting sports, Sherwood (Scoutcraft), Verona (performance and design), Flintlock (a mock 1870s frontier village that has handicraft), and Eagle Oasis (an area dedicated to advancing to the First Class rank).

References

External links 

 Council website

Local councils of the Boy Scouts of America
Youth organizations based in Illinois